Ernest Dwayne Levels (born May 9, 1979) is a former American football linebacker who spent three seasons in the National Football League (NFL) for the Cincinnati Bengals. He also spent one season in the Canadian Football League (CFL), but did not play.

Early life and education
Levels was born on May 9, 1979, in Lubbock County, Texas. He attended Richardson High School in Richardson, Texas, before playing college football for Oklahoma State University. Upon joining the school in 1997, Levels was given a redshirt. He joined the varsity squad the following year, and became a regular starter shortly afterwards. In 2000, Levels was one of the best players on the roster, and made 16 tackles in one game. Teammate Zac Akin said, "Oh, he played his heart and soul out. It's ridiculous. The last few games, he's been barely able to get off the field a couple of times. This game, he's throwing up on the sidelines, goes back in there, makes a couple plays. Finally, we get him talked into going off the field. He's just dying out there. It's amazing. Dwayne is amazing." He returned for a final season in 2001, playing in all eleven games, and made a 57-yard interception return touchdown.

Professional career
After going unselected in the 2002 NFL Draft, Levels signed with the Cincinnati Bengals as an undrafted free agent. He was released at roster cuts and subsequently signed to their practice squad, where he spent the remainder of the season. He was sent to the Barcelona Dragons of NFL Europe in early 2003, and "had an outstanding season", starting all ten games and making 57 tackles. He made the Bengals final roster upon returning, and spent the season playing on special teams and as a backup linebacker. He made his first career start against the Baltimore Ravens in week seven, recording three tackles in the 34–26 win. He finished the season with 15 combined tackles in 13 games. He was waived by the Bengals in July . After spending time out of football in 2005, Levels was signed by the Ottawa Renegades of the Canadian Football League (CFL) in early , only to see them fold shortly afterwards. He was later selected in the 2006 CFL Dispersal Draft by the Montreal Alouettes, but was released in training camp.

References

External links
 
 

1979 births
Living people
Players of American football from Texas
American football linebackers
Canadian football linebackers
Oklahoma State Cowboys football players
Cincinnati Bengals players
Ottawa Renegades players
Montreal Alouettes players